Darrell Bradley (born 1979) is a Belizean attorney and politician. He has served as Mayor of Belize City from 2012 to 2018 

Bradley is an alumnus of Saint Louis University and the University of the West Indies. Prior to his mayoral run he served as youth director for the United Democratic Party. Bradley was elected Belize City mayor in 2012 and re-elected in 2015 and he ended up not running for mayor in 2018 

Bradley was the UDP nominee for the House of Representatives in the Caribbean Shores constituency at the 2015 general election, however, he lost to the PUP candidate Kareem Musa.

In August 2017 Bradley announced he will not run for re-election as Belize City mayor in 2018, but he plans to remain active in politics.

References

1979 births
Date of birth missing (living people)
Belizean lawyers
Living people
Mayors of Belize City
People from Belize City
Saint Louis University alumni
United Democratic Party (Belize) politicians
University of the West Indies alumni